Edgar "Jiovanni" Santana (born December 23, 1989) is an American soccer player who last played as a midfielder for Orange County Blues FC in USL Pro.

Career

Youth and college
Santana played four years of college soccer, two years at California State University, Stanislaus and two at California State University, Dominguez Hills.

He also played in the USL PDL for OC Blues Strikers.

Professional
Along with his brother, Christopher Santana, Jiovanni signed with USL Pro club Orange County Blues on April 16, 2014.

References

1989 births
Living people
American soccer players
Cal State Dominguez Hills Toros men's soccer players
OC Pateadores Blues players
Orange County SC players
Association football midfielders
Soccer players from California
USL League Two players
USL Championship players
People from Bishop, California
California State University, Stanislaus alumni